White Cliffs Solar Power Station was Australia's first solar power station. It is located at White Cliffs, New South Wales, which was chosen as it has the highest insolation in New South Wales, and in 1981 when the station was constructed had no grid connection.

Constructed by a team from Australian National University, the station consisted of fourteen five-metre parabolic dishes, each covered by more than 2000 mirrors and mounted on a heliostatic mounting. The dishes each focussed the sun's rays on a collector, where water was boiled. The resulting steam drove a three-cylinder Uniflow steam engine, made by modifying a Lister diesel engine, delivering up to 25kWe. Batteries were used to provide 24-hour power to selected buildings in the township, and an existing diesel generator retained to provide battery charging when either low insolation or strong winds prevented use of the solar station for extended periods.

In 1996, following grid connection of the township, the station was converted to photovoltaic. The dishes were resurfaced, and the original collectors each replaced by a cluster of 16 water-cooled photovoltaic cells. In its new form, the station delivers up to 45kWe. The batteries, and diesel generator were removed, and the output fed into the grid.

The grid connected power station ran for around 6 years, generating valuable data on the long-term performance and efficiency of the modules. The power station ceased operation in December 2004 and has been resumed by the owner of the site.

In 2006 Engineers Australia placed a heritage marker "recognising the engineering significance of what is arguably considered the world's first commercial solar power station".

In 2012 it was proposed the site be used as a museum.

References

External links

 The White Cliffs project : overview for the period 1979–89 for an overview of the stations' design and operation as a steam plant, prepared by S. Kaneff.
 ROSI project at the University of Wollongong.
 Publications list from the ANU Solar Thermal Group, including a list of reports about the White Cliffs project

Solar power stations in New South Wales
Recipients of Engineers Australia engineering heritage markers